The 1980–81 Nebraska Cornhuskers men's basketball team represented the University of Nebraska, Lincoln during the 1980–81. The Cornhuskers led by first year Head Coach Moe Iba. The team finished with a record of 15–12, 9–5.

Schedule

|-
!colspan=9 style=| Big 8 Tournament

References 

Nebraska
Nebraska Cornhuskers men's basketball seasons
Corn
Corn